Monopoly is a multi-player economics-themed board game. In the game, players roll two dice to move around the game board, buying and trading properties and developing them with houses and hotels. Players collect rent from their opponents, aiming to drive them into bankruptcy. Money can also be gained or lost through Chance and Community Chest cards and tax squares. Players receive a stipend every time they pass "Go" and can end up in jail, from which they cannot move until they have met one of three conditions. House rules, hundreds of different editions, many spin-offs, and related media exist. Monopoly has become a part of international popular culture, having been licensed locally in more than 103 countries and printed in more than 37 languages. , it was estimated that the game had sold 275 million copies worldwide.

Monopoly is derived from The Landlord's Game, created by Lizzie Magie in the United States in 1903 as a way to demonstrate that an economy that rewards individuals is better than one where monopolies hold all the wealth and to promote the economic theories of Henry George—in particular, his ideas about taxation. The Landlord's Game originally had two sets of rules, one with tax and another on which the current rules are mainly based. When Parker Brothers first published Monopoly in 1935, the game did not include the less capitalistic taxation rule, resulting in a more aggressive game. Parker Brothers were eventually absorbed into Hasbro in 1991. The game is named after the economic concept of a monopoly—the domination of a market by a single entity.

History

Early history

The history of Monopoly can be traced back to 1903, when American anti-monopolist Lizzie Magie created a game that she hoped would explain the single-tax theory of Henry George. It was intended as an educational tool, to illustrate the negative aspects of concentrating land-in private monopolies. She took out a patent in 1904. Her game, The Landlord's Game, was self-published, beginning in 1906.

Magie created two sets of rules: an anti-monopolist set in which all were rewarded when wealth was created, and a monopolist set in which the goal was to create monopolies and crush opponents.

Several variant board games, based on her concept, were developed from 1906 through the 1930s; they involved both the process of buying land for its development, and the sale of any undeveloped property. Cardboard houses were added, and rents increased as they were added to a property. Magie patented the game again in 1923.

According to an advertisement placed in The Christian Science Monitor, Charles Todd of Philadelphia recalled the day in 1932 when his childhood friend Esther Jones and her husband, Charles Darrow, came to their house for dinner. After the meal, the Todds introduced Darrow to The Landlord's Game, which they then played several times. The game was entirely new to Darrow, and he asked the Todds for a written set of the rules. After that night, Darrow went on to utilize this, and distribute the game himself as Monopoly.

The Parker Brothers bought the game's copyrights from Darrow. When the company learned Darrow was not the sole inventor of the game, it bought the rights to Magie's patent for $500.

Parker Brothers began marketing the game on November 5, 1935. Cartoonist F. O. Alexander contributed the design. U.S. patent number US 2026082 A was issued to Charles Darrow on December 31, 1935, for the game board design and was assigned to Parker Brothers Inc. The original version of the game in this format was based on the streets of Atlantic City, New Jersey.

1936–1970 
Parker Brothers began licensing the game for sale outside the United States in 1936. In 1941, the British Secret Intelligence Service had John Waddington Ltd., the licensed manufacturer of the game in the United Kingdom, create a special edition for World War II prisoners of war held by the Nazis. Hidden inside these games were maps, compasses, real money, and other objects useful for escaping. They were distributed to prisoners by fake charity organizations created by the British Secret Service.

1970s–1980s
Economics professor Ralph Anspach published Anti-Monopoly in 1973, and was sued for trademark infringement by Parker Brothers in 1974. The case went to trial in 1976. Anspach won on appeals in 1979, as the 9th Circuit Court determined that the trademark Monopoly was generic and therefore unenforceable. The United States Supreme Court declined to hear the case, allowing the appellate court ruling to stand. This decision was overturned by the passage of Public Law 98-620 in 1984. With that law in place, Parker Brothers and its parent company, Hasbro, continue to hold valid trademarks for the game Monopoly. However, Anti-Monopoly was exempted from the law and Anspach later reached a settlement with Hasbro and markets his game under license from them.

The research that Anspach conducted during the course of the litigation was what helped bring the game's history before Charles Darrow into the spotlight.

Hasbro ownership
Hasbro acquired Parker Bros. and thus Monopoly in 1991. Before the Hasbro acquisition, Parker Bros. acted as a publisher only issuing two versions at a time, a regular and deluxe. Hasbro moved to create and license many other versions of Monopoly and sought public input in varying the game. A new wave of licensed products began in 1994, when Hasbro granted a license to USAopoly to begin publishing a San Diego Edition of Monopoly, which has since been followed by more than a hundred more licensees including Winning Moves Games (since 1995) and Winning Solutions, Inc. (since 2000) in the United States.

The company held a national tournament on a chartered train going from Chicago to Atlantic City (see ) in 2003. Also that year, Hasbro sued the maker of Ghettopoly and won. In February 2005, the company sued RADGames over their Super Add-On accessory board game that fit in the center of the board. The judge initially issued an injunction on February 25, 2005, to halt production and sales before ruling in RADGames' favor in April 2005.

The Speed Die was added to all regular Monopoly sets in 2008. After polling their Facebook followers, Hasbro Gaming took the top house rules and added them to a House Rule Edition released in the fall of 2014 and added them as optional rules in 2015. In January 2017, Hasbro invited Internet users to vote on a new set of game pieces, with this new regular edition to be issued in March 2017.

On May 1, 2018, the Monopoly Mansion hotel agreement was announced by Hasbro's managing director for South-East Asia, Hong Kong and Taiwan, Jenny Chew Yean Nee with M101 Holdings Sdn Bhd. M101 has the five-star, 225-room hotel, then under construction, located at the M101 Bukit Bintang in Kuala Lumpur and would have a 1920s Gatsby feel. M101's Sirocco Group would manage the hotel when it opened in 2019.

Hasbro announced in March 2021 that it plans to update the Community Chest cards with ones that will be more socially aware, inviting fans of the game to vote on the new versions. In April 2022, Hasbro announced another poll. This vote would see the reintroduction of one previously retired token in exchange for an existing token. The result of this will see the Thimble token return and the T-Rex phased out by fall 2022.

Board

The Monopoly game board consists of forty spaces containing twenty-eight properties—twenty-two streets (grouped into eight distinct color groups), four railroads, and two utilities—three Chance spaces, three Community Chest spaces, a Luxury Tax space, an Income Tax space, and the four corner squares: GO, (In) Jail/Just Visiting, Free Parking, and Go to Jail.

US versions
There have since been some changes to the board. Not all of the Chance and Community Chest cards as shown in the 1935 patent were used in editions from 1936/1937 onwards. Graphics with the Mr. Monopoly character (then known as "Rich Uncle Pennybags") were added in that same time-frame. A graphic of a chest containing coins was added to the Community Chest spaces, as were the flat purchase prices of the properties. Traditionally, the Community Chest cards were yellow (although they were sometimes printed on blue stock) with no decoration or text on the back; the Chance cards were orange with no text or decoration on the back.

Hasbro commissioned a major graphic redesign to the U.S. Standard Edition of the game in 2008 along with some minor revisions. Among the changes: the colors of Mediterranean and Baltic Avenues changed from purple to brown, and the colors of the GO square changed from red to black. The Luxury Tax amount increased to $100 from $75, and a flat $200 Income Tax was imposed (formerly the player's choice of $200 or 10% of their total holdings, which they could not calculate until after making their final decision). Originally the amount was $300 but was changed a year after the game's debut,. There were also changes to the Chance and Community Chest cards; for example, the "poor tax", "receive for services", "Xmas fund matures", and "grand opera opening" cards became "speeding fine", "receive $25 consultancy fee", "holiday fund matures", and "it is your birthday", respectively; though their effects remained the same; the player must pay only $50 instead of $150 for the school tax. In addition, a player now gets $50 instead of $45 for sale of stock, and the Advance to Illinois Avenue card now has the added text indicating a player collects $200 if they pass Go on the way there.

All the Chance and Community Chest cards received a graphic upgrade in 2008 as part of the graphic refresh of the game. Mr. Monopoly's classic line illustration was also now usually replaced by renderings of a 3D Mr. Monopoly model. The backs of the cards have their respective symbols, with Community Chest cards in blue, and Chance cards in orange.

Additionally, recent versions of Monopoly replace the dollar sign ($) with an M with two horizontal strokes through it.

In the US versions shown below, the properties are named after locations in (or near) Atlantic City, New Jersey.
Atlantic City's Illinois Avenue was renamed Martin Luther King Jr. Blvd. in the 1980s. St. Charles Place no longer exists, as the Showboat Atlantic City was developed where it once ran. The values on the board reflect real estate property values of 1930s Atlantic City: the two cheapest properties, Baltic Avenue and Mediterranean Avenue, were situated in a low-income, African-American neighborhood. Higher-value properties, such as Pennsylvania Avenue, Park Place and Ventnor Avenue, were situated in wealthier neighborhoods.

Different versions have been created based on various current consumer interests such as: Dog-opoly, Cat-opoly, Bug-opoly, and TV/movie games among others.

 Marvin Gardens, the farthest yellow property, is a misspelling of its actual name, Marven Gardens. The misspelling was introduced by Charles and Olive Todd, who taught the game to Charles Darrow. It was passed on when their homemade Monopoly board was copied by Darrow and then by Parker Brothers. The Todds also changed the Atlantic City Quakers' Arctic Avenue to Mediterranean, and shortened the Shore Fast Line to the Short Line.
It was not until 1995 that Parker Brothers acknowledged the misspelling of Marvin Gardens, formally apologizing to the residents of Marven Gardens.

Short Line refers to the Shore Fast Line, a streetcar line that served Atlantic City. The B&O Railroad did not serve Atlantic City. A booklet included with the reprinted 1935 edition states that the four railroads that served Atlantic City in the mid-1930s were the Jersey Central, the Seashore Lines, the Reading Railroad (now part of Norfolk Southern & CSX), and the Pennsylvania Railroad.

The Baltimore & Ohio (now part of CSX) was the parent of the Reading. There is a tunnel in Philadelphia where track to the south was B. & O. and track to the north is Reading. The Central of N.J. did not have a track to Atlantic City but was the daughter of the Reading (and granddaughter of the B. & O.) Their track ran from the New York City area to Delaware Bay and some trains ran on the Reading-controlled track to Atlantic City.

The actual "Electric Company" and "Water Works" serving the city are respectively Atlantic City Electric Company (a subsidiary of Exelon) and the Atlantic City Municipal Utilities Authority.

UK version

In the 1930s, John Waddington Ltd., known as Waddingtons, was a printing company in Leeds that had branched out into packaging and the production of playing cards. Waddingtons had sent the card game Lexicon to Parker Brothers hoping to interest it in publishing the game in the United States. In a similar fashion, Parker Brothers sent over a copy of Monopoly to Waddingtons early in 1935 before the game had been put into production in the United States.

Victor Watson, the managing director of Waddingtons, gave the game to his son Norman, head of the card games division, to test over a weekend. Norman was impressed by the game and persuaded his father to call Parker Brothers on Monday morning—transatlantic calls then being almost unheard of. This call resulted in Waddingtons obtaining a license to produce and market the game outside the United States.

Watson felt that for the game to be a success in the United Kingdom, the American locations would have to be replaced, so Victor and his secretary Marjory Phillips went to London to scout out locations. The Angel, Islington is not a street in London but a building (and the name of the road intersection where it is located). It had been a coaching inn that stood on the Great North Road. By the 1930s, the inn had become a J. Lyons and Co. tea room and is today offices and a Co-operative Bank. Some accounts say that Marjory and Victor met at the Angel to discuss the selection and celebrated the fact by including it on the Monopoly board. In 2003, a plaque commemorating the naming was unveiled at the site by Victor Watson's grandson, who is also named Victor.

During World War II, the British Secret Service contacted Waddingtons, as the company could also print on silk, to make Monopoly sets that included escape maps, money, a compass and file, all hidden in copies of the game sent by fake POW relief charities to prisoners of war.

The standard British board, produced by Waddingtons, was for many years the version most familiar to people in countries in the Commonwealth, except Canada, where the US edition with Atlantic City-area names was reprinted. Local variants of the board are now also found in several Commonwealth countries.

In 1998, Winning Moves procured the Monopoly license from Hasbro and created new UK city and regional editions with sponsored squares. Initially, in December 1998, the game was sold in just a few W H Smith stores, but demand was high, with almost 50,000 games sold in the four weeks before Christmas. Winning Moves still produces new city and regional editions annually.

The original income tax choice from the 1930s US board is replaced by a flat rate on the UK board, and the $75 Luxury Tax space is replaced with the £100 Super Tax space, the same as the current German board. In 2008, the US edition was changed to match the UK and various European editions, including a flat $200 Income Tax value and an increased $100 Luxury Tax amount.

In cases where a national company produced the game, the $ (dollar) sign was replaced with the £ (pound), but the place names were unchanged.

Post-2005 variations
Beginning in the UK in 2005, a revised version of the game, titled Monopoly Here and Now, was produced, replacing game scenarios, properties, and tokens with newer equivalents. Similar boards were produced for Germany and France. Variants of these first editions appeared with Visa-branded debit cards taking the place of cash—the later US "Electronic Banking" edition has unbranded debit cards.

The success of the first Here and Now editions prompted Hasbro US to allow online voting for twenty-six landmark properties across the United States to take their places along the game-board. The popularity of this voting, in turn, led to the creation of similar websites, and secondary game-boards per popular vote to be created in the UK, Canada, France, Germany, Australia, New Zealand, Ireland, and other nations.

Winning Moves Games released the Mega Edition, with a 30% larger game-board and revised game play, in 2006. Other streets from Atlantic City (eight, one per color group) were included, along with a third utility, the Gas Company. In addition, $1,000 denomination notes (first seen in Winning Moves' Monopoly: The Card Game) are included. Game play is further changed with bus tickets (allowing non-dice-roll movement along one side of the board), a speed die (itself adopted into variants of the Atlantic City standard edition; see below), skyscrapers (after houses and hotels), and train depots that can be placed on the Railroad spaces.

This edition was adapted for the U.K. market in 2007, and is sold by Winning Moves UK.  After the initial US release, critiques of some of the rules caused the company to issue revisions and clarifications on their website.

Monopoly Here and Now
The US edition of Monopoly Here and Now was released in September 2006. This edition features top landmarks across the US. The properties were decided by votes over the Internet in the spring of 2006.

Monetary values are multiplied by 10,000 (e.g., one collects $2,000,000 instead of $200 for passing GO and pays that much for Income Tax (or 10% of their total, as this edition was launched prior to 2008), each player starts with $15,000,000 instead of $1,500, etc.). Also, the Chance and Community Chest cards are updated, the Railroads are replaced by Airports (Chicago O'Hare, Los Angeles International, New York City's JFK, and Atlanta's Hartsfield–Jackson), and the Utilities (Electric Company and Water Works) are replaced by Service Providers (Internet Service Provider and Cell Phone Service Provider). The houses and hotels are blue and silver, not green and red as in most editions of Monopoly. The board uses the traditional US layout; the cheapest properties are purple, not brown, and "Interest on Credit Card Debt" replaces "Luxury Tax".

Despite the updated Luxury Tax space, and the Income Tax space no longer using the 10% option, this edition uses paper Monopoly money, and not an electronic banking unit like the Here and Now World Edition. However, a similar edition of Monopoly, the Electronic Banking edition, does feature an electronic banking unit and bank cards, as well as a different set of tokens. Both Here and Now and Electronic Banking feature an updated set of tokens from the Atlantic City edition.

One landmark, Texas Stadium, has been demolished and no longer exists. Another landmark, Jacobs Field, still exists, but was renamed Progressive Field in 2008.

In 2015, in honor of the game's 80th birthday, Hasbro held an online vote to determine which cities would make it into an updated version of Here and Now. This second edition is more a spin-off as the winning condition has changed to completing a passport instead of bankrupting opponents. Community Chest is replaced with Here and Now cards, while the Here and Now space replaced the railroads. Houses and hotels have been removed.

Hasbro released a World edition with the top voted cities from all around the world, as well as at least a Here and Now edition with the voted-on U.S. cities.

Monopoly Empire

Monopoly Empire has uniquely branded tokens and places based on popular brands. Instead of buying properties, players buy popular brands one by one and slide their billboards onto their Empire towers. Instead of building houses and hotels, players collect rent from their rivals based on their tower height. The first player to fill their tower with billboards wins. Every space on the board is a brand name, such as Xbox, Coca-Cola, McDonald's and Samsung.

Monopoly Token Madness

This version of Monopoly contains an extra eight golden tokens. That includes a penguin, a television, a race car, a Mr. Monopoly emoji, a rubber duck, a watch, a wheel and a bunny slipper.

Monopoly Jackpot

During the game, players travel around the gameboard buying properties and collecting rent. If they land on a Chance space, or roll the Chance icon on a die, they can spin the Chance spinner to try to make more money. Players may hit the "Jackpot", go bankrupt, or be sent to Jail. The player who has the most cash when the bank crashes wins.

Monopoly: Ultimate Banking Edition

In this version, there is no cash. The Monopoly Ultimate Banking game features an electronic ultimate banking piece with touch technology. Players can buy properties instantly and set rents by tapping. Each player has a bankcard and their cash is tracked by the Ultimate Banking unit. It can scan the game's property cards and boost or crash the market. Event cards and Location spaces replace Chance and Community Chest cards. On an Event Space, rents may be raised or lowered, a player may earn or lose money, or someone could be sent to Jail. Location Spaces allow players to pay and move to any property space on the gameboard.

Monopoly Voice Banking

In this version, there are no cash or cards. Voice Banking allows the player to respond by voice to the Top Hat. The hat responds by purchasing properties, paying rent, and making buildings.

Ms. Monopoly

Ms. Monopoly is a feminist-oriented version of the game released in 2019 which gives bonuses to female players.

Monopoly Deal

Monopoly Deal is a card game derived from the board-game Monopoly introduced in 2008, produced and sold by Cartamundi under a license from Hasbro. Players attempt to collect three complete sets of cards representing the properties from the original board game, either by playing them directly, stealing them from other players, swapping cards with other players, or collecting them as rent for other properties they already own. The cards in the 110-card deck represent properties and wild cards, various denominations of Monopoly money used to pay rent, and special action cards which can either be played for their effects or banked as money instead.

Equipment

All property deeds, houses, and hotels are held by the bank until bought by the players. A standard set of Monopoly pieces includes:

Cards
A deck of thirty-two Chance and Community Chest cards (sixteen each) which players draw when they land on the corresponding squares of the track, and follow the instructions printed on them.

Deeds
A title deed for each property is given to a player to signify ownership, and specifies purchase price, mortgage value, the cost of building houses and hotels on that property, and the various rents depending on how developed the property is. Properties include:
 Four railroads, players collect $25 rent if they own one railroad; $50 for two; $100 for three; $200 for all four. These are usually replaced by railroad stations in non-U.S. editions of Monopoly.
 Twenty-two streets divided into eight color groups of two or three streets; a player must own all of a color group to build houses or hotels. Once achieved, color group properties must be improved or "broken down" evenly. See the section on Rules.
 Two utilities, rent is four times the dice value if one utility is owned, but ten times if both are owned. Hotels and houses cannot be built on utilities or stations. Some country editions have a fixed rent for utilities; for example, the Italian editions has a L. 2,000 ($20) rent if one utility is owned, or L. 10,000 ($100) if both are owned.

The purchase price for properties varies from $60 to $400 on a U.S. Standard Edition set.

Dice

A pair of six-sided dice is included, with a "speed die" added for variation in 2007. The 1999 Millennium Edition featured two jewel-like dice which were the subject of a lawsuit from Michael Bowling, owner of dice maker Crystal Caste. Hasbro lost the suit in 2008 and had to pay $446,182 in royalties. Subsequent printings of the game reverted to normal six-sided dice.

Houses and hotels
32 houses and 12 hotels made of wood or plastic (the original and current Deluxe Edition have wooden houses and hotels; the current "base set" uses plastic buildings). Unlike money, houses and hotels have a finite supply. If no more are available, no substitute is allowed. In most editions, houses are green and hotels red.

Money

Older U.S. standard editions of the game included a total of $15,140 in the following denominations:
 20 $500 bills (orange)
 20 $100 bills (beige)
 30 $50 bills (blue)
 50 $20 bills (green)
 40 $10 bills (yellow)
 40 $5 bills (pink)
 40 $1 bills (white)

Newer (September 2008 and later) U.S. editions provide a total of $20,580—30 of each denomination instead. The colors of some of the bills are also changed: $10s are now blue instead of yellow, $20s are a brighter green than before, and $50s are now purple instead of blue.

Each player begins the game with their token on the Go square, and $1,500 (or 1,500 of a localized currency) in play money ($2,500 with the Speed Die). Before September 2008, the money was divided with greater numbers of 20 and 10-dollar bills. Since then, the U.S. version has taken on the British version's initial cash distributions.

Although the U.S. version is indicated as allowing eight players, the cash distribution shown above is not possible with all eight players since it requires 32 $100 bills and 40 $1 bills. However, the amount of cash contained in the game is enough for eight players with a slight alteration of bill distribution.

International currencies
Pre-Euro German editions of the game started with 30,000 "Spielmark" in eight denominations (abbreviated as "M."), and later used seven denominations of the Deutsche Mark ("DM."). In the classic Italian game, each player received L. 350,000 ($3500) in a two-player game, but L. 50,000 ($500) less for each player more than two. Only in a six-player game does a player receive the equivalent of $1,500. The classic Italian games were played with only four denominations of currency. Both Spanish editions (the Barcelona and Madrid editions) started the game with 150,000 in play money, with a breakdown identical to that of the American version.

Extra currency
According to the Parker Brothers rules, Monopoly money is theoretically unlimited; if the bank runs out of money it may issue as much as needed "by merely writing on any ordinary paper".
However, Hasbro's published Monopoly rules make no mention of this. Additional paper money can be bought at certain locations, notably game and hobby stores, or downloaded from various websites and printed and cut by hand. One such site has created a $1,000 bill; while a $1,000 bill can be found in Monopoly: The Mega Edition and Monopoly: The Card Game, both published by Winning Moves Games, this note is not a standard denomination for classic versions of Monopoly.

Electronic banking
In several countries there is also a version of the game that features electronic banking. Instead of receiving paper money, each player receives a plastic bank card that is inserted into a calculator-like electronic device that keeps track of the player's balance.

Besides demonstrating the dangers of land rents and monopolies, Lizzie Magie also intended this game for children to learn how to add and subtract through the usage of paper money. However, now with the new innovations of credit cards implemented in these games, many consumers are worried that this purpose of the game is ruined.

Tokens

Classic

Each player is represented by a small metal or plastic token that is moved around the edge of the board according to the roll of two six-sided dice. The number of tokens (and the tokens themselves) have changed over the history of the game with many appearing in special editions only, and some available with non-game purchases. After prints with wood tokens in 1937, a set of eight tokens was introduced. Two more were added in late 1937, and tokens changed again in 1942. During World War II, the game tokens were switched back to wood. Early localized editions of the standard edition (including some Canadian editions, which used the U.S. board layout) did not include pewter tokens but instead had generic wooden pawns identical to those that Sorry! had.

Many of the early tokens were created by companies such as Dowst Miniature Toy Company, which made metal charms and tokens designed to be used on charm bracelets. The battleship and cannon were also used briefly in the Parker Brothers war game Conflict (released in 1940), but after the game failed on the market, the premade pieces were recycled for Monopoly usage. By 1943, there were ten tokens which included the Battleship, Boot, Cannon, Horse and rider, Iron, Racecar, Scottie Dog, Thimble, Top hat, and Wheelbarrow. These tokens remained the same until the late 1990s, when Parker Brothers was sold to Hasbro.

In 1998, a Hasbro advertising campaign asked the public to vote on a new playing piece to be added to the set. The candidates were a bag of money, a bi-plane, and a piggy bank. The bag ended up winning 51 percent of the vote compared to the other two which failed to go above 30%. This new token was added to the set in 1999, bringing the number of tokens to eleven. Another 1998 campaign poll asked people which monopoly token was their favorite. The most popular was the Race Car at 18%, followed by the Dog (16%), Cannon (14%) and Top Hat (10%). The least favorite in the poll was the Wheelbarrow, at 3%, followed by Thimble (7%) and the Iron (7%). The Cannon, and Horse and rider were both retired in 2000 with no new tokens taking their place. Another retirement came in 2007 with the sack of money, bringing the total token count back down to eight again.

In 2013, a similar promotional campaign was launched encouraging the public to vote on one of several possible new tokens to replace an existing one. The choices were a guitar, a diamond ring, a helicopter, a robot, and a cat. This new campaign was different from the one in 1998, as the least-popular existing piece would be retired and replaced with a new one. Both were chosen by a vote that ran on Facebook from January 8 to February 5, 2013. The cat took the top spot with 31% of the vote, while the iron proved to be the least-popular classic piece and was swapped out for the cat. In January 2017, Hasbro placed the line of tokens in the regular edition with another vote which included a total of 64 options. The eight playable tokens at the time included the Battleship, Boot, Cat, Racecar, Scottie Dog, Thimble, Top hat, and Wheelbarrow. By March 17, 2017, Hasbro retired three additional tokens, namely the thimble, wheelbarrow, and boot; these were replaced by a penguin, a Tyrannosaurus and a rubber duck. In April 2022, it was announced that a previously retired token would return to Monopoly sets. The candidates for reintroduction were the wheelbarrow, thimble, iron, horse & rider, boot, and money bag. One existing token would also be dropped from the line-up. Based on the results of the vote, Hasbro announced that starting in Spring 2023, the T-Rex would be replaced by the Thimble in regular sets of Monopoly.

Special editions
Over the years, Hasbro has released tokens for special or collector's editions of the game. One of the first tokens to come out included the Steam Locomotive, which was only released in Deluxe Editions. A Director's Chair token was released in 2011 in limited edition copies of Under the Boardwalk: The Monopoly Story. Shortly after the 2013 Facebook voting campaign, a limited-edition Golden Token set was released exclusively at various national retailers, such as Target in the U.S., and Tesco in the U.K.

The set contained the Battleship, Boot, Iron, Racecar, Scottie Dog, Thimble, Top hat and Wheelbarrow as well as the iron's potential replacements. These replacement tokens included the cat, the guitar, the diamond ring, the helicopter, and the robot. Hasbro released a 64-token limited edition set in 2017 called Monopoly Signature Token Collection to include all of the candidates that were not chosen in the vote held that year.

Rules

Official rules

Each player starts with $1,500 in their bank. Players take turns in order, with the initial player determined by chance before the game. A typical turn begins with the dice rolling and advancing a piece clockwise around the board the corresponding number of squares. If players roll doubles, they move again after completing that portion of their turn. A player who rolls three consecutive sets of doubles on one turn has been "caught speeding" and is immediately sent to jail instead of moving the amount shown on the dice for the third roll.

A player who lands on or passes the "Go" space collects $200 from the bank. Players who land on either Income Tax or Luxury Tax pay the indicated amount to the bank. In older editions of the game, two options were given for Income Tax: either pay a flat fee of $200 or 10% of total net worth (including the current values of all the properties and buildings owned). No calculation could be made before the choice, and no latitude was given for reversing an unwise decision. In 2008, the calculation option was removed from the official rules; simultaneously, the Luxury Tax was increased from $75 to $100. No reward or penalty is given for landing on Free Parking.

Properties can only be developed once a player owns all the properties in that color group. They then must be developed equally. A house must be built on each property of that color before a second can be built. Each property within a group must be within one house level of all the others within that group.

Chance/Community Chest

If a player lands on a Chance or Community Chest space, they draw the top card from the respective deck and follow its instructions. This may include collecting or paying money to the bank or another player or moving to a different space on the board. Two types of cards that involve jail, "Go to Jail" and "Get Out of Jail Free", are explained below.

Jail

A player is sent to jail for doing any of the following:
 Landing directly on the "Go to Jail" space
 Throwing three consecutive doubles in one turn
 Drawing a "Go (Directly) to Jail" card from Chance or Community Chest

When a player is sent to Jail, they move directly to the "In Jail" part of the "In Jail/Just Visiting" space, and their turn ends ("Do not pass Go. Do not collect $200."). If an ordinary dice roll (not one of the above events) ends with the player's token on the Jail corner, they are "Just Visiting" and can move ahead on their next turn without penalty.

If a player is in Jail, they do not take a normal turn and must either pay a fine of $50 to be released, use a Chance or Community Chest Get Out of Jail Free card, or attempt to roll doubles on the dice. If a player fails to roll doubles, they lose their turn. Failing to roll doubles for three consecutive turns requires the player to either pay the $50 fine or use a Get Out of Jail Free card, after which they move ahead according to the total rolled. Players in Jail may not buy properties directly from the bank since they cannot move. This does not impede any other transaction, meaning they can engage in, for example, mortgaging properties, selling/trading properties to other players, buying/selling houses and hotels, collecting rent, and bidding on property auctions. A player who rolls doubles to leave jail does not roll again; however, if the player pays the fine or uses a card to get out and then rolls doubles, they take another turn.

The odds of rolling doubles are 6 in 36 (1 in 6) in any given roll, hence the odds of rolling into jail due to three consecutive doubles are 1 in 216 (the cube of 6.)

Properties
If the player lands on an unowned property, whether street, railroad, or utility, they can buy the property for its listed purchase price. If they decline this purchase, the property is auctioned off by the bank to the highest bidder, including the player who declined to buy. If the property landed on is already owned and unmortgaged, they must pay the owner a given rent; the amount depends on whether the property is part of a set or its level of development. Players may trade properties or sell them to other players at any time in any deal that is mutually agreed upon, with the exception that properties with buildings may not be traded or sold. When a player owns all the properties in a color group and none of them are mortgaged, they may develop them during their turn or in between other player's turns. Development involves buying miniature houses or hotels from the bank and placing them on the property spaces; this must be done uniformly across the group. Therefore, a second house cannot be built on any property within a group until all of them have one house. Once the player owns an entire group, they can collect double rent for any undeveloped properties within it. Although houses and hotels cannot be built on railroads or utilities, the given rent increases if a player owns more than one of either type. If there is a housing shortage (more demand for houses to be built than what remains in the bank), then a housing auction is conducted to determine who will get to purchase each house.

Mortgaging
Properties can also be mortgaged, although all developments on a monopoly must be sold before any property of that color can be mortgaged or traded. The player receives half the purchase price from the bank for each mortgaged property. This must be repaid with 10% interest to clear the mortgage. Houses and hotels can be sold back to the bank for half their purchase price. Players cannot collect rent on mortgaged properties and may not give improved property away to others; however, trading mortgaged properties is allowed. The player receiving the mortgaged property must immediately pay the bank the mortgage price plus 10% or pay just the 10% amount and keep the property mortgaged; if the player chooses the latter, they must pay the 10% again when they pay off the mortgage.

Bankruptcy
A player who cannot pay what they owe is bankrupt and eliminated from the game. If the bankrupt player owes the bank, they must turn all their assets over to the bank, who then auctions off their properties (if they have any), except buildings. If the debt is owed to another player instead, all assets are given to that opponent, except buildings, which must be returned to the bank. The new owner must either pay off any mortgages held by the bank on such properties received or pay a fee of 10% of the mortgaged value to the bank if they choose to leave the properties mortgaged.

The winner is the player remaining after all of the others have gone bankrupt. In a 2-player game, if a player goes bankrupt to the other player or the bank, the game is over and there is no need for the bank to conduct the auction as the other player will have automatically won. The winning player only then needs to pay the final fees from the property transfer, in the event of a tournament where each dollar in net assets actually matters.

If a player runs out of money but still has assets that can be converted to cash, they can do so by selling buildings, mortgaging properties, or trading with other players. To avoid bankruptcy the player must be able to raise enough cash to pay the full amount owed.

A player cannot choose to go bankrupt; if there is no way to pay what they owe, even by returning all their buildings at a loss, mortgaging all their real estate and giving up all their cash, even knowing they are likely going bankrupt the next time, they must do so and immediately retire from the game.

Official Short Game rules
From 1936, the rules booklet included with each Monopoly set contained a short section at the end providing rules for making the game shorter, including dealing out two Title Deed cards to each player before starting the game, by setting a time limit or by ending the game after the second player goes bankrupt. A later version of the rules included this variant, along with the time limit game, in the main rules booklet, omitting the last, the second bankruptcy method, as a third short game.

House rules

Many house rules have emerged for the game throughout its history. Well-known is the "Free Parking jackpot rule", where all the money collected from Income Tax, Luxury Tax, Chance and Community Chest goes to the center of the board instead of the bank. Many people add $500 to start each pile of Free Parking money, guaranteeing a minimum payout. When a player lands on Free Parking, they may take the money. Another rule is that if a player lands directly on Go (rather than passing by it on their turn), they collect double the usual amount ($400 instead of $200).

Other commonly-used house rules include: eliminating property auctions if a player declines to buy or cannot afford an unowned property on which they land; awarding additional money for rolling "snake eyes", allowing a player to loan money to another player; or enabling someone to grant rent immunity to someone else.

Since these rules typically provide additional cash to players regardless of their property management choices, they can lengthen the game considerably and limit the role of strategy.

Video game and computer game versions of Monopoly have options where popular house rules can be used. In 2014, Hasbro determined five popular house rules by public Facebook vote, and released a "House Rules Edition" of the board game. Rules selected include a "Free Parking" house rule without additional money and forcing players to traverse the board once before buying properties.

Strategy
According to Jim Slater in The Mayfair Set, the Orange property group is the best to own because players land on them more often, as a result of the Chance cards "Go to Jail", "Advance to St. Charles Place (Pall Mall)", "Advance to Reading Railroad (Kings Cross Station)" and "Go Back Three Spaces".

In all, during game play, Illinois Avenue (Trafalgar Square) (Red), New York Avenue (Vine Street) (Orange), B&O Railroad (Fenchurch Street Station), and Reading Railroad (Kings Cross Station) are the most frequently landed-upon properties. Mediterranean Avenue (Old Kent Road) (brown), Baltic Avenue (Whitechapel Road) (brown), Park Place (Park Lane) (blue), and Oriental Avenue (The Angel, Islington) (light blue) are the least-landed-upon properties. Among the property groups, the Railroads are most frequently landed upon, as no other group has four properties; Orange has the next highest frequency, followed by Red.

According to Business Insider, the best way to get the most out of every property is through houses and hotels. In order to do so, the player must have all the corresponding properties of the color set. Three houses allows the player to make all the money they spent on the houses back and earn even more as players land on those properties.

Trading 
Trading is a vital strategy in order to accumulate all the properties in a color set. Obtaining all the properties in a specific color set enables the player to buy houses and hotels which increase the rent another player has to pay when they land on the property. According to Slate, players trade to speed up the process and secure a win. Building at least 3 houses on each property allows the player to break even once at least one player lands on this property.

End game
One common criticism of Monopoly is that although it has carefully defined termination conditions, it may take an unlimited amount of time to reach them. Edward P. Parker, a former president of Parker Brothers, is quoted as saying, "We always felt that forty-five minutes was about the right length for a game, but Monopoly could go on for hours. Also, a game was supposed to have a definite end somewhere. In Monopoly you kept going around and around."

Hasbro states that the longest game of Monopoly ever played lasted 70 days.

Related games

Add-ons
Numerous add-ons have been produced for Monopoly, sold independently from the game both before its commercialization and after, with three official ones discussed below:

Stock Exchange
The original Stock Exchange add-on was published by Capitol Novelty Co. of Rensselaer, New York in early 1936. It was marketed as an add-on for Monopoly, Finance, or Easy Money games. Shortly after Capitol Novelty introduced Stock Exchange, Parker Brothers bought it from them then marketed their own, slightly redesigned, version as an add-on specifically for their "new" Monopoly game; the Parker Brothers version was available in June 1936. The Free Parking square is covered over by a new Stock Exchange space and the add-on included three Chance and three Community Chest cards directing the player to "Advance to Stock Exchange".

The Stock Exchange add-on was later redesigned and re-released in 1992 under license by Chessex, this time including a larger number of new Chance and Community Chest cards. This version included ten new Chance cards (five "Advance to Stock Exchange" and five other related cards) and eleven new Community Chest cards (five "Advance to Stock Exchange" and six other related cards; the regular Community Chest card "From sale of stock you get $45" is removed from play when using these cards). Many of the original rules applied to this new version (in fact, one optional play choice allows for playing in the original form by only adding the "Advance to Stock Exchange" cards to each deck).

A Monopoly Stock Exchange Edition was released in 2001 (although not in the U.S.), this time adding an electronic calculator-like device to keep track of the complex stock figures. This was a full edition, not just an add-on, that came with its own board, money and playing pieces. Properties on the board were replaced by companies on which shares could be floated, and offices and home offices (instead of houses and hotels) could be built.

Playmaster
Playmaster, another official add-on, released in 1982, is an electronic device that keeps track of all player movement and dice rolls as well as what properties are still available. It then uses this information to call random auctions and mortgages making it easier to free up cards of a color group. It also plays eight short tunes when key game functions occur; for example when a player lands on a railroad it plays "I've Been Working on the Railroad", and a police car's siren sounds when a player goes to Jail.

Get Out of Jail and Free Parking Minigames
In 2009, Hasbro released two minigames that can be played as stand-alone games or combined with the Monopoly game. In Get Out of Jail, the goal is to manipulate a spade under a jail cell to flick out various colored prisoners. The game can be used as an alternative to rolling doubles to get out of jail. In Free Parking, players attempt to balance taxis on a wobbly board. The Free Parking add-on can also be used with the Monopoly game. When a player lands on the Free Parking, the player can take the Taxi Challenge, and if successful, can move to any space on the board.

Speed Die

First included in Winning Moves' Monopoly: The Mega Edition variant, this third, six-sided die is rolled with the other two, and accelerates game-play when in use. In 2007, Parker Brothers began releasing its standard version (also called the Speed Die Edition) of Monopoly with the same die (originally in blue, later in red). Its faces are: 1, 2, 3, two "Mr. Monopoly" sides, and a bus. The numbers behave as normal, adding to the other two dice, unless a "triple" is rolled, in which case the player can move to any space on the board. If "Mr. Monopoly" is rolled while there are unowned properties, the player advances forward to the nearest one. Otherwise, the player advances to the nearest property on which rent is owed. In the Monopoly: Mega Edition, rolling the bus allows the player to take the regular dice move, then either take a bus ticket or move to the nearest draw card space.

Mega rules specifies that triples do not count as doubles for going to jail as the player does not roll again. Used in a regular edition, the bus (properly "get off the bus") allows the player to use only one of the two numbered dice or the sum of both, thus a roll of 1, 5, and bus would let the player choose between moving 1, 5, or 6 spaces. The Speed Die is used throughout the game in the "Mega Edition", while in the "Regular Edition" it is used by any player who has passed GO at least once. In these editions it remains optional, although use of the Speed Die was made mandatory for use in the 2009 U.S. and World Monopoly Championship, as well as the 2015 World Championship.

Spin-offs
Parker Brothers and its licensees have also sold several spin-offs of Monopoly. These are not add-ons, as they do not function as an addition to the Monopoly game, but are simply additional games with the flavor of Monopoly:
 Advance to Boardwalk board game (1985): Focusing mainly on building the most hotels along the Boardwalk.
 Don't Go to Jail: Dice game originally released by Parker Brothers; roll combinations of dice to create color groups for points before rolling the words "GO" "TO" and "JAIL" (which forfeits all earned points for the turn).
 Monopoly Express: A deluxe, travel edition re-release of Don't Go To Jail, replacing the word dice with "Officer Jones" dice and adding an eleventh die, Houses & Hotels, and a self-contained game container/dice roller & keeper. In 2021, this game was re-released as Monopoly DICED!, with the same elements and gameplay, but in a square container rather than the round one used for the Express version.
 Express Monopoly card game (1994 U.S., 1995 U.K.): Released by Hasbro/Parker Brothers and Waddingtons in the U.K., now out of print. Basically a rummy-style card game based on scoring points by completing color group sections of the game-board.
 Free Parking card game (1988) A more complex card game released by Parker Brothers, with several similarities to the card game Mille Bornes. Uses cards to either add time to parking meters, or spend the time doing activities to earn points. Includes a deck of Second Chance cards that further alter game-play. Two editions were made; minor differences in card art and Second Chance cards in each edition.
 Monopoly: The Card Game (2000) an updated card game released by Winning Moves Games under license from Hasbro. Similar, but decidedly more complex, game-play to the Express Monopoly card game.
 Monopoly City: Game-play retains similar flavor but has been made significantly more complex in this version. The traditional properties are replaced by "districts" mapped to the previously underutilized real estate in the centre of the board.
 Monopoly Deal: The most recent card game version of Monopoly. Players attempt to complete three property groups by playing property, cash & event cards.
 Monopoly Junior board game (first published 1990, multiple variations since): A simplified version of the original game for young children.
 Monopoly Town by Parker Brothers / Hasbro (2008) a young children's game of racing designed to help them learn to count.
 The Mad Magazine Game (1979): Gameplay is similar, but the goals and directions often opposite to those of Monopoly; the object is for players to lose all of their money.

Monopoly for Sore Losers
Monopoly for Sore Losers is a spin-off of Monopoly. It was published in 2020 by Hasbro and, according to the box, "creates—and celebrates—sore losers".

Its main difference from standard Monopoly is the introduction of a sore loser mechanic, which allows players to temporarily assume control of a special token that protects them from most negative effects of landing on board spaces—at their opponents' expense.

Gameplay differences from regular Monopoly 
During the initial roll to determine turn order, the player with the lowest total goes first.

The main difference from standard Monopoly is the introduction of the sore loser mechanic. Each player is given 2 sore loser coins upon the start of the game, and the remainder are placed in the centre of the board. A player collects a sore loser coin from the Bank if they have to do any of the following: pay rent to another player, pay taxes and bills to the Bank, go to jail, land on a property that they own, or draw a Chance or Community Chest card that instructs them to collect a coin. If a player lands on Free Parking, they are allowed to steal a sore loser coin from another player, which could be traded.

A player may not collect a sore loser coin if they have four. At the beginning of their turn, a player with four sore loser coins, may place them in the centre of the board. That player then takes the Mr. Monopoly token and replaces their token with the Mr. Monopoly token—their normal token being placed in the centre of the board. Whilst a player is Mr. Monopoly, they cannot collect sore loser coins, and the actions they take when landing on spaces are altered, including collecting money when landing on the properties of other players, collecting money from the bank when landing on a tax or bill space, not go to jail, and requiring other players to lose sore loser coins.

Whenever any player, including Mr. Monopoly's owner, rolls doubles, Mr. Monopoly's owner is allowed to place one free house on any street on the board. The property selected for this free house does not need to be owned by Mr. Monopoly, nor does it need to be part of a complete set, and placing doubles houses unevenly is also allowed. However, Mr. Monopoly's owner may not place this free house on a street that already has four houses, nor may they upgrade to a hotel.

Buildings are permanent and could not be sold. If a property with buildings on it is traded away, the buildings remain and start providing rent to the new owner.

If Mr. Monopoly's dice roll makes him land on the same space as another player, the Mr. Monopoly token is placed over that other player's token, and Mr. Monopoly's owner is allowed to steal one property from the player he landed on—said property must not be part of a complete set. If a property with buildings on it is stolen, the buildings remain on the property and start providing rent to Mr. Monopoly's owner. In addition, whilst a player is under Mr. Monopoly, they are trapped—their turn will be skipped until Mr. Monopoly moves, but said players can still take part in auctions and trade. If Mr. Monopoly lands on the Jail space, he traps other players on both spaces. However, these actions could not be taken if a player becomes Mr. Monopoly whilst on the same space as another player.

Once Mr. Monopoly is in play, if another player cashes in their sore loser coins to become him, the old owner restores their normal token to the space they are on, and Mr. Monopoly is transferred to the space of the new owner, whose token is placed in the centre of the board.

If a player goes bankrupt, their sore loser coins are returned to the centre of the board.

The game is ended through one of two means- bankruptcy or all of the properties have been purchased. If the latter happens, players must return to Go, with Mr. Monopoly's owner not allowed to steal a property when they land on Go for the final time. Players subsequently collect rent from all of their properties, according to full colour sets and development, and after that the player with the most capital is the winner.

Video games

Besides the many variants of the actual game (and the Monopoly Junior spin-off) released in either video game or computer game formats (e.g., Commodore 64, Macintosh, Windows-based PC, Game Boy, Game Boy Advance, Nintendo Entertainment System, iPad, Genesis, Super NES, etc.), two spin-off computer games have been created. An electronic hand-held version was marketed from 1997 to 2001.
 Monopoly: The iPhone game designed by Electronic Arts.
 Monopoly Millionaires: The Facebook game designed by Playfish.
 Monopoly Streets: A video game played for the Xbox 360, Wii, and PlayStation 3. The video game includes properties now played on a street.
 Monopoly Tycoon: A game where players build businesses on the properties they own.
 Monopoly Plus: A game for the Xbox One and PlayStation 4 with high definition graphics.
 Monopoly: The mobile game on iOS and Android devices designed by Marmalade Game Studios.

Gambling games
Monopoly-themed slot machines and lotteries have been produced by WMS Gaming in conjunction with International Game Technology for land-based casinos. WagerWorks, who have the online rights to Monopoly, have created online Monopoly themed games.

London's Gamesys Group have also developed Monopoly-themed gambling games. The British quiz machine brand itbox also supports a Monopoly trivia and chance game.

There was also a live, online version of Monopoly. Six painted taxis drive around London picking up passengers. When the taxis reach their final destination, the region of London that they are in is displayed on the online board. This version takes far longer to play than board-game Monopoly, with one game lasting 24 hours. Results and position are sent to players via e-mail at the conclusion of the game.

Play-by-mail game
Mail Games Inc. created a play-by-mail game (PBM) version of Monopoly, reviewed in the August–September 1990 issue of White Wolf Magazine. The PBM version was similar to the board game, although compared to many PBM games it was relatively simple. The game moderator processed players' turn orders simultaneously, but alternated the order that players' turns were initiated to allow sequential transactions as in the board game.

Media

Commercial promotions

The McDonald's Monopoly game is a sweepstakes advertising promotion of McDonald's and Hasbro that has been offered in Argentina, Australia, Austria, Brazil, Canada, France, Germany, Hong Kong, Ireland, the Netherlands, New Zealand, Poland, Portugal, Romania, Russia, Singapore, South Africa, Spain, Switzerland, Taiwan, United Kingdom and United States.

Television game show

A short-lived Monopoly game show aired on Saturday evenings from June 16 to September 1, 1990, on ABC. The show was produced by Merv Griffin and hosted by Mike Reilly. The show was paired with a summer-long Super Jeopardy! tournament, which also aired during this period on ABC.

From 2010 to 2014, The Hub aired the game show Family Game Night with Todd Newton. For the first two seasons, teams earned cash in the form of "Monopoly Crazy Cash Cards" from the "Monopoly Crazy Cash Corner", which was then inserted to the "Monopoly Crazy Cash Machine" at the end of the show. In addition, beginning with Season 2, teams won "Monopoly Party Packages" for winning the individual games. For Season 3, there was a Community Chest. Each card on Mr. Monopoly had a combination of three colors. Teams used the combination card to unlock the chest. If it was the right combination, they advanced to the Crazy Cash Machine for a brand-new car. For the show's fourth season, a new game was added called Monopoly Remix, featuring Park Place and Boardwalk, as well as Income Tax and Luxury Tax.

To honor the game's 80th anniversary, a game show in syndication on March 28, 2015, called Monopoly Millionaires' Club was launched. It was connected with a multi-state lottery game of the same name and hosted by comedian Billy Gardell from Mike & Molly. The game show was filmed at the Rio All Suite Hotel and Casino and at Bally's Las Vegas in Las Vegas, with players having a chance to win up to $1,000,000. However, the lottery game connected with the game show (which provided the contestants) went through multiple complications and variations, and the game show last aired at the end of April 2016.

Films
In November 2008, Ridley Scott was announced to direct Universal Pictures' film version of the game, based on a script written by Pamela Pettler. The film was being co-produced by Hasbro's Brian Goldner as part of a deal with Hasbro to develop movies based on the company's line of toys and games. The story was being developed by author Frank Beddor. However, Universal eventually halted development in February 2012 then opted out of the agreement and the rights reverted to Hasbro.

In October 2012, Hasbro announced a new partnership with production company Emmett/Furla Films, and said they would develop a live-action version of Monopoly, along with Action Man and Hungry Hungry Hippos. Emmett/Furla/Oasis dropped out of the production of this satire version that was to be directed by Ridley Scott.

In July 2015, Hasbro announced that Lionsgate will distribute a Monopoly film with Andrew Niccol writing the film as a family-friendly action adventure film co-financed and produced by Lionsgate and Hasbro's Allspark Pictures.

In January 2019, it was announced that Allspark Pictures would now be producing an untitled Monopoly film in conjunction with Kevin Hart's company HartBeat Productions and The Story Company. Hart is attached to star in the film and Tim Story is attached to direct. No logline or writer for this iteration of the long-gestating project has been announced.

The documentary Under the Boardwalk: The MONOPOLY Story, covering the history and players of the game, won an Audience Award for Best Documentary at the 2010 Anaheim International Film Festival. The film played theatrically in the U.S. beginning in March 2011 and was released on Amazon and iTunes on February 14, 2012. The television version of the film won four regional Emmy Awards from the Pacific Southwest Chapter of NATAS. The film is directed by Kevin Tostado and narrated by Zachary Levi.

It is the subject of Stephen Ives' documentary film Ruthless: Monopoly’s Secret History which first aired on American Experience on February 20, 2023.

Tournaments

U.S. National Championship
Until 1999, U.S. entrants had to win a state/district/territory competition to represent that state/district/territory at the once every four-year national championship. The 1999 U.S. National Tournament had 50 contestants—49 State Champions (Oklahoma was not represented) and the reigning national champion.

Qualifying for the National Championship has been online since 2003. For the 2003 Championship, qualification was limited to the first fifty people who correctly completed an online quiz. Out of concerns that such methods of qualifying might not always ensure a competition of the best players, the 2009 Championship qualifying was expanded to include an online multiple-choice quiz (a score of 80% or better was required to advance); followed by an online five-question essay test; followed by a two-game online tournament at Pogo.com. The process was to have produced a field of 23 plus one: Matt McNally, the 2003 national champion, who received a bye and was not required to qualify. However, at the end of the online tournament, there was an eleven-way tie for the last six spots. The decision was made to invite all of those who had tied for said spots. In fact, two of those who had tied and would have otherwise been eliminated, Dale Crabtree of Indianapolis, Indiana, and Brandon Baker, of Tuscaloosa, Alabama, played in the final game and finished third and fourth respectively.

The 2009 Monopoly U.S. National Championship was held on April 14–15 in Washington, D.C. In his first tournament ever, Richard Marinaccio, an attorney from Sloan, New York (a suburb of Buffalo), prevailed over a field that included two previous champions to be crowned the 2009 U.S. National Champion. In addition to the title, Marinaccio took home $20,580—the amount of money in the bank of the board game—and competed in the 2009 World Championship in Las Vegas, Nevada, on October 21–22, where he finished in third place.

In 2015, Hasbro used a competition that was held solely online to determine who would be the U.S. representative to compete at the 2015 Monopoly World Championship. Interested players took a twenty-question quiz on Monopoly strategy and rules and submitted a hundred-word essay on how to win a Monopoly tournament. Hasbro then selected Brian Valentine of Washington, D.C., to be the U.S. representative.

World Championship
Hasbro conducts a worldwide Monopoly tournament. The first Monopoly World Championships took place in Grossinger's Resort in New York, in November 1973, but they did not include competitors from outside the United States until 1975. It has been aired in the United States by ESPN. In 2009, forty-one players competed for the title of Monopoly World Champion and a cash prize of $20,580 (USD)—the total amount of Monopoly money in the current Monopoly set used in the tournament. The most recent World Championship took place September 2015 in Macau. Italian Nicolò Falcone defeated the defending world champion and players from twenty-six other countries. A World Championship had been planned for 2021 and 2022, but Hasbro has canceled it due to the Coronavirus pandemic.

Variants
Because Monopoly evolved in the public domain before its commercialization, Monopoly has seen many variant games. The game is licensed in 103 countries and printed in thirty-seven languages. Most of the variants are exact copies of the Monopoly games with the street names replaced with locales from a particular town, university, or fictional place. National boards have been released as well. Over the years, many specialty Monopoly editions, licensed by Parker Brothers/Hasbro, and produced by them, or their licensees (including USAopoly and Winning Moves Games) have been sold to local and national markets worldwide. Two well known "families" of -opoly like games, without licenses from Parker Brothers/Hasbro, have also been produced.

Several published games like Monopoly include:
 Anti-Monopoly, one of several games that are a sort of Monopoly backwards. The name of this game led to legal action between Anti-Monopolys creator, Ralph Anspach, and the owners of Monopoly.
 Business, a Monopoly-like game not associated with Hasbro. In this version the "properties" to be bought are cities of India; Chance and Community Chest reference lists of results printed in the center of the board, keyed to the dice roll; and money is represented by counters, not paper.
 Dostihy a sázky, a variant sold in Czechoslovakia. This game comes from the authoritarian communist era (1948–1989), when private business was abolished and mortgages did not exist, so the monopoly theme was changed to a horse racing theme.
 Ghettopoly, released in 2003, was the subject of considerable outrage upon its release. The game, intended to be a humorous rendering of ghetto life, was decried as racist for its unflinching use of racial stereotypes. Hasbro sought and received an injunction against Ghettopoly's designer.
 Make Your Own -OPOLY: This game allows players considerable freedom in customizing the board, money, and rules.
 Matador: The unlicensed Danish version from BRIO with a round board instead of the square one, cars instead of tokens and includes breweries and ferries to buy. The game also has candy and a popular TV series Matador named after it.
 Turism, a variant sold in Romania.
 Kleptopoly, released in 2017 where users can be like Jho Low. Inspired by the 1Malaysia Development Berhad scandal.
 Monopoly for Millennials, released by Hasbro in 2018.

Other unlicensed editions include: BibleOpoly, HomoNoPolis and Petropolis, among others.

Games by locale or theme
There have been a large number of localized editions, broken down here by region:
 List of licensed and localized editions of Monopoly: Africa and Asia (including the Middle East and South-East Asia but excluding Russia and Turkey)
 List of licensed and localized editions of Monopoly: Europe (including Russia and Turkey)
 List of licensed and localized editions of Monopoly: North America (including Central America but excluding the United States of America)
 List of licensed and localized editions of Monopoly: Oceania (Australia and New Zealand)
 List of licensed and localized editions of Monopoly: South America
 List of licensed and localized editions of Monopoly: USA (including the United States of America and all editions based on commercial brands)

Unauthorized and parody games
This list is of unauthorized, unlicensed games based on Monopoly:

Ghettopoly

Middopoly
Memeopolis (Android app)

World editions

In 2008, Hasbro released Monopoly Here and Now: The World Edition. This world edition features top locations of the world. The locations were decided by votes over the Internet. The result of the voting was announced on August 20, 2008.

Out of these, Gdynia is especially notable, as it is by far the smallest city of those featured and won the vote as a "wild card" along with Taipei thanks to its residents and supporters. The new game uses its own currency unit, the Monopolonian (a game-based take on the Euro; designated by M). 

It is also notable that three cities (Montreal, Toronto, and Vancouver) are from Canada and three other cities (Beijing, Hong Kong, and Shanghai) are from the People's Republic of China. No other countries are represented by more than one city.

Of the 68 cities listed on Hasbro Inc.'s website for the vote, Jerusalem was chosen as one of the 20 cities to be featured in the newest Monopoly World Edition. Before the vote took place, a Hasbro employee in the London office eliminated the country signifier "Israel" after the city, in response to pressure from pro-Palestinian advocacy groups. After the Israeli government protested, Hasbro Inc. issued a statement that read: "It was a bad decision, one that we rectified relatively quickly. This is a game. We never wanted to enter into any political debate. We apologize to our Monopoly fans."

A similar online vote was held in early 2015 for an updated version of the game. The resulting board was released worldwide in late 2015. Lima, Peru, won the vote to hold the Boardwalk space.

Deluxe editions
Hasbro sells a Deluxe Edition, which is mostly identical to the classic edition but has wooden houses and hotels and gold-toned tokens, including one token in addition to the standard eleven, a railroad locomotive. Other additions to the Deluxe Edition include a card carousel, which holds the title deed cards, and money printed with two colors of ink.

In 1978, retailer Neiman Marcus manufactured and sold an all-chocolate edition of Monopoly through its Christmas Wish Book for that year. The entire set was edible, including the money, dice, hotels, properties, tokens and playing board. The set retailed for $600.

In 2000, the FAO Schwarz store in New York City sold a custom version called One-Of-A-Kind Monopoly for $100,000. This special edition comes in a locking attaché case made with Napolino leather and lined in suede, and features include:
 18-carat (75%) gold tokens, houses, and hotels
 Rosewood board
 Street names written in gold leaf
 Emeralds around the Chance icon
 Sapphires around the Community Chest
 Rubies in the brake lights of the car on the Free Parking Space
 The money is real, negotiable United States currency

The Guinness Book of World Records states that a set worth $2,000,000 and made of 23-carat gold, with rubies and sapphires atop the chimneys of the houses and hotels, is the most expensive Monopoly set ever produced. This set was designed by artist Sidney Mobell to honor the game's 50th anniversary in 1985, and is now in the Smithsonian Institution.

Reception
Despite the game's legacy and forming a prominent aspect of modern culture, contemporary reviews of Monopoly is largely negative. On BoardGameGeek, the game is ranked in the bottom ten board games, with a mean rating of 4.4/10. Wired magazine believes Monopoly is a poorly designed game. Former Wall Streeter Derk Solko explains, "Monopoly has you grinding your opponents into dust. It's a very negative experience. It's all about cackling when your opponent lands on your space and you get to take all their money." Wired further observed that most of the three to four-hour average playing time is spent waiting for other players to play their turn, and there is usually little to no choice involved. "Board game enthusiasts disparagingly call this a 'roll your dice, move your mice' format." FiveThirtyEight also stated that the game suffers from issues of elimination and a runaway leader, problems that "most game designers nowadays try to avoid". The Guardian also describes Monopoly as "a collection of terrible design choices" combined with "an array of house rules that serve only to make the experience ever more interminable".

Games magazine included Monopoly in their "Top 100 Games of 1980", praising it as "the original landlord game in which players buy, sell, and rent Atlantic City real estate at pre-casino prices" and noting that at the time it was "so popular that Parker Brothers prints more paper money each year than the U.S Government".

Games magazine included Monopoly in their "Top 100 Games of 1981", noting that despite having been "Initially rejected by both Parker and Milton Bradley as containing 'fundamental errors' that the public would not accept", it became "one of the most popular games in the world, and deservedly so".

Games magazine included Monopoly in their "Top 100 Games of 1982", commenting that "The orange monopoly is the best [...] Try counting how many times you land on it as you leave jail."

Figurative language
Monopoly's popularity has led to it spawning a number of English turns of phrase. These include:
 Rich Uncle Pennybags, also known as "Mr. Monopoly", the game's mascot character
 Get Out of Jail Free card, a popular metaphor for something that will get one out of an undesired situation
 Monopoly money, a derisive term to refer to money not really worth anything, or at least not being used as if it is worth anything. It could also allude to colorful currency notes used in some countries, such as Canada.
 "Do not pass Go. Do not collect $200" is a phrase used in Monopoly that has become widely used in popular culture to describe an action forced upon a person that has only negative results. The phrase comes from the game's Chance and Community Chest cards, which a player must draw from if they land on specific spaces. Each deck has a card that reads "GO TO JAIL: Go directly to Jail. Do not pass Go. Do not collect $200." Early in the game, going to jail usually hurts a player as it prevents them from moving, which regularly leads to earning $200 from passing Go, and from landing on and buying property, though in the later game, jail prevents them from landing on others' developed property and having to pay rent. The cited phrase, "Do not pass Go. Do not collect $200", distinguishes the effect from other cards that move players; other cards use the phrasing "Advance to [a particular location]", which does allow the player to collect $200 if they pass Go during the advance. The phrase is used in popular culture to denote a situation in which there is only one immediate, highly unfavorable, irreversible outcome and has been described as a "harsh cliché".

References

Bibliography 

 
 
 
 
 
 
 
 Reader's Digest: The truth about history (2003) article "Monopoly on ideas".

External links 

 
 Database of street names in local editions
 Monopoly Nerd Blog The strategies, tactics, and math behind Monopoly.
 Monopoly Tournaments.com
 Online Monopoly Simulator interactive, customizable real-world Monopoly simulator and estimated win percentage generator.
 Over 1700 Monopoly versions, updated continuously (some unofficial)
 The official Hasbro site
 The official US Monopoly web site
  Patent awarded to C. B. Darrow for Monopoly on December 31, 1935
 What The Monopoly Properties Look Like In Real Life « Scouting NY (September 23, 2013)
 worldofmonopoly.com Monopoly history, properties around the world and various editions.

Monopoly (game)
American inventions
Atlantic City, New Jersey
Board games introduced in 1935
Economic simulation board games
Hasbro products
Game.com games
Multiplayer games
Roll-and-move board games
Tabletop games
Virtual economies